Domnall mac Caustantín is thought to have been king of Dál Riata in the early ninth century.

Domnall's existence is uncertain, and is based on attempts to reconcile eleventh century works such as the poem Duan Albanach and the Synchronisms of Flann Mainistrech with the evidence of the Irish annals.

The Duan says that Domnall reigned for twenty-four years and places him between "Aodh", Áed Find, and the two Conalls, Conall mac Taidg and Conall mac Áedáin. Flann gives Domnall's father's name as "Constantine". The only person of that relatively uncommon name known is Causantín mac Fergusa, king of the Picts from 792 to 820. Since Áed Find died in 778, and his brother Fergus mac Echdach was king of Dál Riata at his death in 781, it is thought unlikely that Caustantín's son could have been king as early as 781. Additionally, a king named Donncoirce is reported to have died in 792, and Conall mac Taidg died in 807, making it very difficult to accommodate a 24-year reign at this time.

Since no kings of Dál Riata are known for the period from 811, when the four-year reign of Conall mac Áedáin is presumed to have ended, and the four-year reign of Áed mac Boanta who died in 839, Domnall mac Caustantín may have been king from around 811 to around 835.

See also
 House of Óengus

Notes

References

 Anderson, Alan Orr, Early Sources of Scottish History A.D 500–1286, volume 1. Reprinted with corrections. Paul Watkins, Stamford, 1990. 
 Bannerman, John, "The Scottish Takeover of Pictland" in Dauvit Broun & Thomas Owen Clancy (eds.) Spes Scotorum: Hope of Scots. Saint Columba, Iona and Scotland. T & T Clark, Edinburgh, 1999. 
 Broun, Dauvit, "Pictish Kings 761–839: Integration with Dál Riata or Separate Development" in Sally M. Foster (ed.), The St Andrews Sarcophagus: A Pictish masterpiece and its international connections. Four Courts, Dublin, 1998.

External links
 CELT: Corpus of Electronic Texts at University College Cork includes the Annals of Ulster, Tigernach, the Four Masters and Innisfallen, the Chronicon Scotorum, the Lebor Bretnach (which includes the Duan Albanach), Genealogies, and various Saints' Lives. Most are translated into English, or translations are in progress.

Kings of Dál Riata
9th-century Irish monarchs
9th-century Scottish monarchs